Elections were held in Hastings County, Ontario on October 22, 2018, in conjunction with municipal elections across the province.

Hastings County Council
Hastings County Council consists of the mayors and reeves of the 14 constituent municipalities.

Bancroft

Carlow/Mayo

Centre Hastings

Deseronto

Faraday

Hastings Highlands

Source:

Limerick

Source:

Madoc

Source:

Marmora and Lake

Source:

Stirling-Rawdon

Source:

Tudor and Cashel

Tweed

Source:

Tyendinaga

Source:

Wollaston

Source:

References

Hastings
Hastings County